David Muller (born 1964) is an educator.

David Muller may also refer to:
David A Muller, physicist, electron microscopist
David Stone (magician) (David Muller, born 1972), French comedian, writer, producer and magician
David E. Muller (1924–2008), mathematician, computer scientist, inventor of Delay Insensitive Minterm Synthesis
David Muller, musician in Domino

See also
David Müller (disambiguation)